Woodfords (formerly, Brannan Springs, Carey's Mill, Cary's Mills, Carys Mill, Carys Mills, Woodford's, Carey's Mills, and Woodford) is an unincorporated community in Alpine County, California, near Markleeville. For census purposes, it is included in Alpine Village.

History
Woodfords holds title as the oldest non-native settlement in the entire region.  Sam Brannan left supplies near a spring here in 1847 on his way to Salt Lake City, and Brannan Springs, as it was then called, was ideally positioned to take advantage of traffic on the booming road to California.

After a brief period during which the settlement was known as Carey's Mills, the Woodfords name came into common usage following the establishment of an official post office near a hotel by Daniel Woodford in 1849. A post office opened in Carey's Mills in 1858, the name was changed to Woodfords in 1869, and was closed in 1914; the post office was re-established in 1962, only to close for good in 1974.

Woodfords became a remount station of the Pony Express on April 4, 1860, when Warren Upson scaled the mountains in a blinding snowstorm, reached Woodfords from Lake Tahoe via Luther Pass, and made his way down the eastern slope of the Sierra on his way to Carson City. Five weeks later the Pony Express was rerouted by way of Echo Summit and the Kingsbury Grade. The remount station is now California Historical Landmark #805.

Woodfords is home to about 150 full-time residents, while the Southern band of the Washo tribe has a small community in nearby Diamond Valley.

References

Unincorporated communities in Alpine County, California
Populated places in the Sierra Nevada (United States)
California Historical Landmarks
Pony Express stations
Populated places established in 1847
1847 establishments in Alta California
Unincorporated communities in California